José Porfirio Alarcón Hernández (born 10 March 1945) is a Mexican politician affiliated with the Institutional Revolutionary Party. As of 2014 he served as Deputy of the LV and LIX Legislatures of the Mexican Congress representing Puebla.

References

1945 births
Living people
Politicians from Puebla
Institutional Revolutionary Party politicians
Deputies of the LIX Legislature of Mexico
Members of the Chamber of Deputies (Mexico) for Puebla